Kilverstone is a civil parish in the English county of Norfolk east of Thetford.
For the purposes of local government, it falls within the district of Breckland.

Its church, St Andrew, is one of 124 existing round-tower churches in Norfolk.

Notable residents
The great naval reformer Admiral Jacky Fisher (Baron Fisher of Kilverstone) lived at nearby Kilverstone Hall.

Notes

External links

St Andrew's on the European Round Tower Churches website

Villages in Norfolk
Civil parishes in Norfolk
Breckland District